William Tchuameni Kouemo (born 25 December 1996) is a Cameroonian professional footballer who plays as a striker for Inter Zaprešić in the Croatian First Football League.

Career

SønderjyskE
Tchuameni joined Danish club SønderjyskE in July 2017. He left the club after two years.

References

External links

1996 births
Living people
Cameroonian footballers
C.D. Feirense players
SønderjyskE Fodbold players
NK Inter Zaprešić players
Danish Superliga players
Croatian Football League players
Association football forwards
Expatriate footballers in Portugal
Expatriate men's footballers in Denmark
Expatriate footballers in Croatia